The 2020 season was the sixth season of competitive association football and fifth season in the Liga 1 played by Bali United Football Club, a professional football club based in Gianyar, Bali, Indonesia. Their 1st-place finish in 2019 mean it was their fifth successive season in Liga 1.

Coming into the season, Bali United were the reigning Liga 1 champions. They also qualified for the AFC Champions League preliminary round 1 and ASEAN Club Championship group stage. This season was Bali United's second with head coach Stefano Cugurra. But Emral Abus served as a head coach in the AFC Champions League because there was a slight problem with Stefano Cugurra's coaching license which makes it administratively unable to be registered as a head coach. The same case also happen in AFC Cup where Eko Purjianto was registered as head coach.

They unable to finished all of this season competition (except for AFC Champions league which they finished in preliminary round 2) because all competition this season was cancelled due to the COVID-19 pandemic.

Background 
The 2019 season was Stefano Cugurra's first full season as head coach of Bali United, having taken charge in January 2019. The team went on a 12-match unbeaten run from July until September. This saw Bali United became the champions of 2019 Liga 1 with four matches left. Bali United were beaten 2–2 on away goals aggregate by Persija in the quarter-finals of 2018–19 Piala Indonesia.

Pre-season and friendlies

Friendlies

Review and events

January–March 
Bali United started their new season with preliminary round 1 of the AFC Champions League by playing away to Jalan Besar Stadium, Singapore to face 2019 Singapore Cup winners, Tampines Rovers. Playing on artificial turf, Melvin Platje gave Bali United an early lead with two goals inside 15 minute. Tampines Rovers pull one back with a goal before half time. Tampines Rovers evened the score in the 53rd minute and took the lead in the 68th minute by an own goal from their new signing, Rahmat. Rahmat paid for his mistake with an equalizing goal in the 81st minute and the match continues to extra time. Stefano Lilipaly and the other new signing Sidik Saimima ensured a 5–3 win and Bali United through to preliminary round 2. They once again failed to reach the group stage as they were destroyed by four-time A-League champions, Melbourne Victory five goals without reply at AAMI Park which resulted them to played in AFC Cup.

Once again Bali United were drawn into Group G. Ceres–Negros (Philippines), Svay Rieng (Cambodia), and Than Quảng Ninh (Vietnam) joined the group. The team opened their AFC Cup campaign with a win against 10-men Than Quảng Ninh after falling behind 0–1 in the first half. Rahmat and Platje started their comeback in just five minutes into the second half. Ilija Spasojević scored from a penalty before Platje sealed the game 4–1. They failed to continue their momentum as they lose to Svay Rieng. Once again played in artificial turf, they conceded two goals inside the 20th minute before Spasojević scored the only goals for the team.

They were held to a stalemate against Persita in the first match of March and Liga 1.
A trip to the Demang Lehman Stadium to face Barito Putera five days after ended in a 2–1 win; the goals, scored by Lilipaly in the first half and the returning Lerby Eliandry in the second half. Losing three key players really affected the game of Bali United which made them lose 4–0 to Ceres–Negros in the continuation of the AFC Cup group stage. They bounce back with a 3–1 win against Madura United in the league. Platje scored two goals and Paulo Sérgio scored two assists plus a controversially disallowed goal from Spasojević marked their performance after back from injuries.

Match results

Liga 1

AFC Champions League

AFC Cup

Player details

Appearances and goals 

 No. in bracket is the player's number in AFC Competitions.

Disciplinary record

Transfers

Transfers in

Transfers out

Loans out

References 

Bali United F.C. seasons
Bali United